Metatrichoniscoides is a genus of isopod crustacean in family Trichoniscidae.

There are five recognised species:<ref name=WoRMS>

 Metatrichoniscoides celticus Oliver & Trew, 1981
 Metatrichoniscoides fouresi Vandel, 1950
 Metatrichoniscoides leydigi (Weber, 1880)
 Metatrichoniscoides nemausiensis Vandel, 1943
 Metatrichoniscoides salirensis Reboleira & Taiti, 2015

References

Woodlice
Taxonomy articles created by Polbot